Newbern is an unincorporated community in Shelby County, in the U.S. state of Ohio.

History
Newbern was located on the Miami and Erie Canal.

References

Unincorporated communities in Shelby County, Ohio
Unincorporated communities in Ohio